Geumneung Station is a railway station on the Gyeongui-Jungang Line. It is located in the Geumchon neighborhood of Paju city, Gyeonggi-do, in the far northern region of South Korea.

Across from the station on one side is Rodeo Street, a large cluster of shops and restaurants (including Chinese, Italian, and Vietnamese eateries) housed in five-story buildings. On the other side of the station lies only a very large rice/vegetable field.

Station Layout

External links

Metro stations in Paju
Seoul Metropolitan Subway stations
Railway stations opened in 2004